Šmartno is a village in the Municipality of Cerklje na Gorenjskem in the Upper Carniola region of Slovenia.

Church

The local church is dedicated to Saint Martin, giving the name to the village itself. It was first mentioned in written documents from 1387, but archaeological evidence shows it is built on the site of an early Christian church from Late Antiquity.

References

External links

Šmartno on Geopedia

Populated places in the Municipality of Cerklje na Gorenjskem